The Slovakia women's national handball team is the national team of Slovakia. It takes part in international handball competitions. 

The team participated in the 1995 World Women's Handball Championship, placing 12th.

Results

World Championships

European Championship

Performance in other tournaments  
 Carpathian Trophy 2005 – Second place

Current squad
Squad for the 2021 World Women's Handball Championship.

Head coach: Pavol Streicher

References

External links

IHF profile

National team
Handball
Women's national handball teams